Louis Harold Gray FRS (10 November 1905 – 9 July 1965) was an English physicist who worked mainly on the effects of radiation on biological systems. He was one of the earliest contributors of the field of radiobiology  A summary of his work is given below.  Amongst many other achievements, he defined a unit of radiation dosage (absorbed dose) which was later named after him as an SI unit , the gray.

Career
 1933 - Hospital physicist at Mount Vernon Hospital, London
 1936 - Developed the Bragg–Gray equation, the basis for the cavity ionization method of measuring gamma-ray energy absorption by materials
 1937 - Built an early neutron generator at Mount Vernon Hospital
 1938 - Studied biological effects of neutrons using the generator
 1940 - Developed concept of RBE (Relative Biological Effectiveness) of doses of neutrons
 1952 - Initiated research into cells in hypoxic tumors and hyperbaric oxygen
 1953 - Established the British Empire Cancer Campaign Research Unit in Radiobiology at Mount Vernon Hospital which in 1970 became  the Cancer Research Campaign’s Gray Laboratory and then (in 2001) the Gray Cancer Institute.
 1953 - 1960 - Under Gray's direction, Jack W. Boag developed pulse radiolysis
 1962 - Ed Hart, of Argonne National Laboratory, and Jack Boag discovered the hydrated electron using pulse radiolysis at the Gray Laboratory - This discovery initiated a new direction of research that is still very active today and is vital for understanding the effects of radiation on biological tissue, for instance in cancer treatment.

References

External links
 Definition of RBE
 The LH Gray Memorial Trust founded in 1967
 Cancer Research UK and Medical Research Council Oxford Institute for Radiation Oncology

1905 births
1965 deaths
Directors of Gray Cancer Institute
British physicists
Radiobiologists
People educated at Christ's Hospital
Fellows of the Royal Society
20th-century British botanists
Radiation protection
Fellows of Trinity College, Cambridge